Cheliferoides is a genus of jumping spiders that was first described by Frederick Octavius Pickard-Cambridge in 1901.  it contains only three species, found only in Guatemala, Panama, and the United States: C. longimanus, C. planus, and C. segmentatus.

References

Salticidae
Salticidae genera
Spiders of Central America
Spiders of North America
Taxa named by Frederick Octavius Pickard-Cambridge